The 1898 Victorian Football League (VFL) season was the second season of the VFL. The season saw 138 Australian rules footballers make their senior VFL debut and six players transferring to new clubs having previously played in the 1897 VFL season.

Summary

Debuts

References

Australian rules football records and statistics
Australian rules football-related lists
1898 in Australian rules football